Salani is a Garhwali dialect spoken in the Pauri district of Uttarakhand, northern India. G.A. Grierson has described it as "practically the same as Srinagaria".

Region and stats

it is spoken to the South of Rathwali, in the Parganas of Malla, Tallā and Gañgā Salan, in the parganas to the immediate North and in Western portion of Pali pargana of Almora.

Below are the statistics of estimated number of speakers in different regions, as of early 20th century:

Script & specimen

See also 

 Bangani
 Rathwali
 Nagpuria
 Jaunpuri
 Garhwali
 Kumaoni
 Jaunsari

References 

Northern Indo-Aryan languages
Endangered languages of India
Languages of Uttarakhand